The Işıklı gudgeon (Gobio maeandricus) is a species of gudgeon, a small freshwater in the family Cyprinidae. It is endemic to the Büyük Menderes River in Turkey.

References

 

Gobio
Taxa named by Alexander Mikhailovich Naseka
Taxa named by Füsun Erk'akan
Taxa named by Fahrettin Küçük
Fish described in 2006